Jorge Viana (born September 20, 1959) is a Brazilian engineer and politician. He has represented Acre in the Federal Senate since 2011. Previously, he was Governor of Acre from 1999 to 2007. He is a member of the Workers' Party. 
After Renan Calheiros lost the presidency of the Senate, Viana is now the president of the Brazilian Senate.

He opposed the impeachment of President Dilma Rousseff.

Viana is also a member of Washington D.C. based think tank, The Inter-American Dialogue.

See also
 List of mayors of Rio Branco, Acre

References

Living people
1959 births
Governors of Acre (state)
Mayors of places in Brazil
Members of the Federal Senate (Brazil)
Members of the Inter-American Dialogue
People from Rio Branco, Acre
Workers' Party (Brazil) politicians
Brazilian foresters